I'll Be Around is the fifth studio album by the American bluegrass band Split Lip Rayfield, released on October 15, 2008 (see 2008 in music).  It is significant in that this is the first studio album after former guitar player Kirk Rundstrom's death, and it is dedicated to his memory.  Also of note in the liner notes is a set of instructions to the building of the famous "Gas-Tank Bass" of Jeff Eaton.

Track listing
(composer in parentheses)
Rig or Cross 	                (Mardis) 	2:32
All the Same 	                (Gottstine) 	2:37
Aces High 	                (Mardis) 	3:25
Heart of Darkness 	        (Gottstine) 	2:49
Factory 	                (Gottstine) 	2:05
The High Price of Necromancy 	(Mardis) 	2:23
Fallen 	                (Gottstine) 	3:40
Hobo Love Song 	        (Gottstine) 	2:14
Devil Lies 	                (Mardis) 	3:16
It's Been So Long 	        (Gottstine) 	3:55
Sin River 	                (Gottstine) 	1:46
I'll Be Around 	        (Mardis)        3:57

Personnel
Jeff Eaton -  Gas-Tank Bass, Backing vocals
Wayne Gottstine    - Mandolin, Vocals
Eric Mardis   -  Banjo, Vocals

External links
[| All Music link]

2008 albums
Split Lip Rayfield albums